Urumi (Malayalam: uṟumi; Sinhalese: ethunu kaduwa; Hindi: āra) is a sword with a flexible, whip-like blade, originating in modern-day Kerala in the Indian subcontinent. It is thought to have existed from as early as the Sangam period. 

It is treated as a steel whip and therefore requires prior knowledge of that weapon as well as the sword. For this reason, the urumi is always taught last in Indian martial arts such as Kalaripayattu.

The word urumi is used to refer to the weapon in Malayalam. In Kerala, it is also called chuttuval, from the Malayalam words for "coiling," or "spinning,"(chuttu) and "sword" (val). Alternatively, Tamil names for the weapon are surul katti (coiling knife), surul val (coiling sword) and surul pattakatti (coiling machete).

Anatomy

The urumi hilt is constructed from iron or brass and is identical to that of the talwar, complete with a crossguard and frequently a slender knucklebow. The typical handle is termed a "disc hilt" from the prominent disc-shaped flange surrounding the pommel. The pommel often has a short decorative spike-like protrusion projecting from its centre. The blade is fashioned from flexible edged steel measuring three-quarters to one inch in width. Ideally, the length of the blade should be the same as the wielder's armspan, usually between 4 feet to 5.5 feet. Multiple blades are often attached to a single handle. The Sri Lankan variation can have up to 32 blades and is typically dual-wielded, with one in each hand.

Use
The urumi is handled like a flail but requires less strength since the blade combined with centrifugal force is sufficient to inflict injury. As with other "soft" weapons, urumi wielders learn to follow and control the momentum of the blade with each swing, thus techniques include spins and agile manoeuvres. These long-reaching spins make the weapon particularly well suited to fighting against multiple opponents. When not in use, the urumi is worn coiled around the waist like a belt, with the handle at the wearer's side like a conventional sword.

Legacy
A peptide found in the mucus of a South Indian frog is named urumin. This name is inspired from the urumi, since urumin kills the H1N1 flu virus effectively.

See also 
Angampora
Chain whip
Kalaripayattu
Silambam

References

Blade weapons
South Asian swords
Indian swords
Weapons of India
Whips